North Carolina is the twenty-eighth richest state in the United States of America, with a per capita income of $20,307 (2000).

North Carolina Counties Ranked by Per Capita Income

Note: Data is from the 2010 United States Census Data and the 2006-2010 American Community Survey 5-Year Estimates.

References

United States locations by per capita income
Economy of North Carolina
Income